Bao Jingyan or Pao Ching-yen (Pinyin: Bào Jìngyán) was a Chinese, libertarian philosopher and Taoist who lived somewhere between the late 200's AD and before 400 AD.

Political thought 
A successor of Laozi and Zhuang Zhou strain of libertarian Taoism, Pao Ching-yen was, according to Etienne Balazs, "China’s first political anarchist."

Bao Jingyan was the author of the treatise "Neither Lord Nor Subject", preserved in the Waipian (part of the Baopuzi) of the Taoist Ge Hong. The latter has indeed worked to refute Bao's essay. Bao was the first in China to place utopia in the field of politics. Influenced by Zhuangzi's thought, he opposed despotic absolutism. Given the obscurity of Bao Jingyan's person, Jean Levi hypothesized that he could have been the pen name of Ge Hong, who would thus pass subversive theses without taking too many risks, or at the very least that Ge felt a certain sympathy towards these theses. But this claim does not fit well with his Confucian-legalist political philosophy and criticisms of the disorderly political consequences of Lao-Zhuang political discourse.

See also 

 No gods, no masters, a similar anarchist slogan

References

Bibliography
 
 .
 ; Hardcover .
 
 
 
 .

External links
 Neither Lord Nor Subject: Taoist Anarchism - Anthony Comegna, Libertarianism.org
 Ge Hong (Ko Hung, 283—343 C.E.) - Keith Knapp, Internet Encyclopedia of Philosophy

5th-century Chinese philosophers
Jin dynasty (266–420) philosophers
Chinese Taoists
Proto-anarchists